P. des Molins, probably Pierre des Molins, was a French composer-poet in the ars nova style of late medieval music. His two surviving compositions – the ballade De ce que fol pensé and rondeau Amis, tout dous vis – were tremendously popular as they are among the most transmitted pieces of fourteenth-century music. The ballade is found in 12 medieval manuscript sources and featured in a  tapestry; the rondeau is found in 8 sources and referenced by the Italian poet Simone de' Prodenzani. Along with Grimace, Jehan Vaillant and F. Andrieu, Molins was one of the post-Guillaume de Machaut generation whose music shows few distinctly ars subtilior features, leading scholars to recognize Molins's work as closer to the ars nova style of Machaut.

Identity and career
P. des Molins is only known for two works, the three-part ballade De ce que fol pensé and three-part rondeau Amis, tout dous vis. No secure biographical information about Molins exists. His name is given as "P. des Molins" in the Chantilly Codex and as "Mulino" in the codex, Paris, Bibl. Nat. MS ital. 568. In several sources, the title of Amis, tout dous [le] vis is given as "The mills of Paris," (Molendium de Paris, Die molen van Pariis, and El Molin de Paris), probably misconstruing the name of the composer (Molins means mill) as the title of the piece. His name signifies that he originally hailed from the north of France, although he is thought to have emigrated to southern France at the Avignon court. In doing so he would have been in the company of many composers of the time, such as Grimace, Jacob Senleches and Trebor.

Craig Wright has suggested that he was the musician in the court of Jean II, King of France, named "Perotus de Molyno," placing him in England from 1357 to 1359. The reference to the "languid en estrange contrée" in De ce que fol could refer to the captivity of the court under King Edward III. Earlier, Suzanne Clercx and Richard Hoppin suggested that he could have been the Petrus de Molendino, civis parisiensis mentioned in connection with Pope Clement VI in 1345. Ursula Günther has connected him tentatively with a Perrotum Danielis alias del moli from a document from 1387 or as the chancellor of the Duke of Berry, Philippe de Moulins mentioned in 1368 and 1371.

Music

De ce que fol pense
De ce que fol pense appears in twelve sources. In one of these sources, Strasbourg 222, it is attributed to Guillaume de Machaut, an ascription universally rejected by scholars. The composition's opening cantus part appears in a 15th-century tapestry depicting a lady harp player reading from the score held by her servant.

Amis, tout dous vis
Amis, tous dous [le] vis appears in eight musical sources and is cited in Il Solazzo by Simone de' Prodenzani. Amis, tout dous vis is found as a highly decorated version in some sources; the work is listed as Di molen van Pariis and is likely intended to be instrumental.

Works

Editions
P. des Molins's works are included in the following collections:

Recordings

References

Notes

Citations

Sources
Books

 
 
 
 
 
 
 

Journals and articles

 
 
  
 
 

Online

Blog by subject-matter expert

External links
 
 Works by P. des Molins in the Medieval Music Database from La Trobe University

14th-century French composers
Year of birth unknown
Year of death unknown
French classical composers
French male classical composers
Medieval male composers
Ars nova composers